The Amazing Mrs Pritchard is a British drama series that aired on BBC One in 2006. Produced by Kudos, it was written by Sally Wainwright and stars Jane Horrocks in the title role of a woman with no previous political experience who becomes Prime Minister of the United Kingdom.

Plot
The Amazing Mrs Pritchard revolves around supermarket manager Ros Pritchard, who, angry with the state of British politics, stands for election as an independent candidate in her home town of Eatanswill, Yorkshire.
She soon gains national attention, forming the Purple Alliance alongside former Conservatives and Liberal Democrats and winning the general election, becoming Prime Minister.  Over successive episodes, Ros's spontaneous approach to decision making and her promise never to deceive the electorate come under increasing pressure from the demands of government, media scrutiny, and partisan political struggles.

Cast and characters

Main cast
Jane Horrocks - Prime Minister Rosamund 'Ros' Jane Pritchard
Steven Mackintosh - Ian Pritchard
Carey Mulligan - Emily Pritchard
Jemma McKenzie-Brown - Georgina Pritchard
Jodhi May - Miranda Lennox
Janet McTeer - Catherine Walker
Frances Tomelty - Kitty Porter
Geraldine James - Hilary Rees-Benson
Selina Cadell - Dorothy Crowther
Meera Syal - Liz Shannon
Siobhan Finneran - Beverley Clarke
Jonathan Aris - Richard Leavis
Sally Phillips - Meg Bayliss
Tom Mison - Ben Sixsmith
Robert Portal - Paul Critchley
Dilys Laye - Queen Elizabeth II

Characters
Rosamund 'Ros' Jane Pritchard is a supermarket manager who creates her own party, the Purple Democratic Alliance. Ros succeeds Tony Blair, having won the general election by a huge landslide. When she first comes to the job she knows nothing about politics, but with the help of her advisor Catherine Walker, who becomes Deputy Prime Minister and Chancellor of the Exchequer, she warms to the job, dealing with crises such as a plane exploding over Walthamstow and proposing a one-day-a-week car ban.

Ian Pritchard is Ros's husband. He doubts her campaign, and later admits that he didn't vote for her. Unknown to Ros at the time, Ian laundered money many years before her taking office, a scandal which, as it starts to emerge, may force her to resign.

Emily Pritchard is Ros's older daughter. Emily finds her mother's new fame hard to deal with.  Initially a student at the University of Sussex, she soon drops out.  A magazine deal sees naked pictures of her projected onto the Houses of Parliament.  And when her father admits his money laundering to Emily, it is a secret she finds hard to keep.

Catherine Walker is a Conservative front-bencher designated by her party to demolish Ros in debate, but who instead defects to Ros's Purple Alliance.  She becomes Deputy Prime Minister and Chancellor of the Exchequer.  As a young woman at the University of Oxford, Catherine had the chance of a fellowship to study at Princeton University but her then-tutor Hilary Rees-Benson (later a political opponent) recommended another student instead, in part due to jealousy of Catherine—the two remain rivals even when serving together in Ros's cabinet. Catherine was formerly in love with Conservative Party Leader Paul Critchley, but he cheated on her and dropped her. While Chancellor, she conducts a sexual relationship with her speechwriter Ben Sixsmith—21 years her junior—becoming pregnant by him but terminating the pregnancy.

Hilary Rees-Benson is the Home Secretary in Ros's government. She was formerly a Liberal Democratic Party Home Affairs spokesman, and has an ongoing personal and political conflict with Catherine Walker (above). Rees-Benson leaks a number of secrets to the writer Alex Rafael about Pritchard's government, which damages it. She almost has to resign but agrees to absolute loyalty to Ros. Hilary makes a success of Ros's controversial proposal for Green Wednesday, a car ban on every Wednesday.

Kitty Porter is a wealthy businesswoman who becomes one of Ros's earliest supporters, bankrolling her campaign.  But Kitty's behind-the-scenes machinations represent another time bomb waiting to explode.

Paul Critchley is the Leader of the Conservative Party and the Leader of the Opposition to Ros's Government.  He holds a bitter grudge against Catherine, his former lover, who in his eyes betrayed him and his party by defecting to Ros.  Critchley's skill as a parliamentary debater, and his ruthless willingness to throw a politically inconvenient colleague overboard, epitomise the peak of traditional politics, and contrast with the spontaneous, idealistic—if at times naive—approach embodied by Ros, at least in the earlier episodes before political life starts to harden her.

Guests and cameos
Several politicians and journalists made cameo appearances, including Tony Blair, Gavin Esler, Roy Hattersley, John Humphrys, Nick Robinson, David Steel, Andrew Marr, Simon McCoy, Sarah Montague, Peter Snow and Kirsty Wark.

Production

Development
Sally Wainwright stated her motivation for writing the series was the realisation that:

 "During the last election I found that I didn't really want to vote for anybody because they all seemed as bad as each other. I thought it would be great fun to write an epic story with a central character who was prepared to stand up and point this out. Mrs Pritchard is bold enough, or some may say daft enough, to stand for parliament on the assumption that she can do just as badly as any of them but at least she will be honest".

The Amazing Mrs Pritchard was filmed in London in April 2006, and the episodes were broadcast at 9:00 pm on Tuesdays. It fared poorly in the ratings, attracting 3.5 million viewers in the final episode.

Episodes

Home media
The Amazing Mrs Pritchard was released on DVD in the US (Region 1) on 30 October 2007.

See also
List of fictional prime ministers of the United Kingdom

References

External links 
 
 Purple Alliance
 Petition to move Parliament to Bradford
 

2006 British television series debuts
2006 British television series endings
2000s British drama television series
2000s British political television series
2000s British television miniseries
BBC high definition shows
BBC television dramas
Television series about prime ministers
Television series created by Sally Wainwright
British political drama television series
2006 in British politics
Television shows set in London
Works about prime ministers of the United Kingdom